The Technical Theatre Awards (TTA) were created in 2013 by Olivia Dermot Walsh. The intention is to provide the theatre and events industries with a series of awards, to provide recognition for the work and achievements of technical theatre individuals over the past year.

Nominations can be submitted by anyone, whether they are performers, companies or an individual. Voting on the nominees runs June–August, with the awards presented in a ceremony at the closing of the PLASA Show exhibition in September.

Awards

Awards are often sponsored by companies within the industry. Companies can choose to sponsor an award in their particular area of interest, or one that is not normally affiliated with the company.

In the past, sponsoring companies have included Philips Entertainment, Production Resource Group (PRG), Triple E and Theatres Trust.

Current Awards
The “Rigging Team” Award for Outstanding Achievement in Automation
The “Robe” Hire Company Team of the Year Award
The “Design Software Solutions” Award for Outstanding Achievement in Education
The “Triple E” Award for Outstanding Achievement in Flys & Rigging
The “Philips Entertainment” Award for Outstanding Achievement in Lighting
The “PRG” Award for Outstanding Achievement in Production Management
The Award for Outstanding Achievement in Prop Making
The “SNP Productions” Award for Outstanding Achievement in Media Server Programming
The “Total Solutions Group” Award for Outstanding Achievement in Set Construction
The Award for Outstanding Achievement in Scenic Artistry
The “Douglas Turnbull” Award for Outstanding Achievement in Company Management
The “d&b audiotechnik” Award for Outstanding Achievement in Sound
The Award for Outstanding Achievement in Stage Crew
The “GDS” Award for Outstanding Achievement in Stage Management
The Award for Outstanding Achievement in Wardrobe
The “Charcoalblue” Award for Venue Sustainability
The “Pigs Might Fly South” Award for Outstanding Achievement in Wigs & Makeup

Discontinued Awards
The Award for Outstanding Achievement in Performer Flying - 2014 only

See also
List of awards in theatre

References

External links
 

British theatre awards